Byndoor  is a coastal town and headquarters of Byndoor Taluk in the Udupi District of Karnataka state, India. It lies in the foothills of Western Ghats on one side and a virgin Someshwar Beach on the other side. The Mookambika Road Byndoor railway station focuses on the pilgrims visiting the Kollur Mookambika Temple which is 28 km from Byndoor. Near by another railway station name is Bijoor, As many as 26 villages including Shiroor, Paduvari, Yadthare, Byndoor, Taggarse, Uppunda, Nandanavana, Kergalu, (Naikanakatte) Bijoor, Kirimanjeshwar, Ullur, Khambadakone, Heranjalu, Navunda, Badakere, Maravanthe, Hadavu, Naada, herur, Kalthodu, Golihole, Yalajith, Kollur, Jadkal, Mudoor, and Hallihole have been brought together under the Byndoor taluk.

Someshwara beach
The beach near Byndoor is called Someshwara beach, because of a temple there.

Demographics
According to the 2011 census Byndoor Town had a population of 24,957. Byndoor Town Panchayat contains 4 Areas: Yedthare, Paduvari, Taggarse and Byndoor. Byndoor is also called as "Bindupura Chief town during Hoysala Empire".

Administration 
The Byndoor Town Panchayat(ಬೈಂದೂರು ಪಟ್ಟಣ ಪಂಚಾಯತ್) is the Town Municipal Corporation. Also, Byndoor comes under Shivamogga Lok Sabha Constituency. and Byndoor Vidhana Sabha Constituency

Tourist attractions 
 Byndoor Someshwara Beach
 Kshitija Nesara Dhama
 Ottinene Beach & Sunset Point
 Koosalli Waterfalls
 Sri Seneshwara Temple
 Gulnadi Waterfall, Yeljith Byndoor
 Aanejhary Butterfly Camp
 Holy Cross Hill Byndoor
 Sri Mookambika Temple Kollur

Byndoor Town Panchayat

 Yedthare
 Baindur
 Paduvari
 Taggarse

Grama Panchayat and Villages in Byndoor Taluk

 Shiroor
 Bijoor
 Uppunda
 Khambadakone
 Kirimanjeshwara
 Navunda
 Maravanthe
 Padukone
 Hallihole
 Kollur
 Jadkal
 Dombe
 Ullur
 Hoskote
 Arehole
 Areshiroor
 Alandoor
 Badakere
 Golihole
 Ganganadu
 Hadavu
 Herooru
 Heranjalu
 Halageri
 Halkal
 Kalthodu
 Kergalu
 Mudoor
 Naada
 Nagoor
 Naykanakatte
 Nandanavana
 Tarapati
 Upralli
 Yaljith

Railway station
Byndoor City is served by Mookambika Road Byndoor railway station, one of the major railway stations in coastal Karnataka in South India. Its four-letter code is BYNR. Trains connect the station to prominent state capitals of India, including Bangalore, Thiruvananthapuram (via Southern Railway), Mumbai, and (via Konkan Railways). The station was established in 1997.

A total of 36 express and passenger trains stop there. The Mookambika Road-Kannur Passenger train used to start and end at the station, however this service was terminated in 2017 due to lack of revenue generation.

Geography
It is situated in the northern part of Udupi

References

External links

Cities and towns in Udupi district